Marlyse Baptista is a linguist specializing in morphology, syntax, pidgin and creole languages, language contact, and language documentation. She is currently Uriel Weinreich Collegiate Professor of Linguistics at the University of Michigan.

Biography 
Baptista's parents are from Cape Verde, and she grew up in France as part of the Cape Verdean diaspora. After studying for a licence (1986) and then an MA (1987) in Anglophone literatures and civilizations at the Université de Bordeaux III, she moved to the United States to study for a further MA in ESL at the University of Massachusetts (1990). Her subsequent studies took place at Harvard University, where she completed a third MA and then a PhD in linguistics, awarded in 1997.

Post-PhD she spent a year as a visiting scholar in the Department of Linguistics and Philosophy at MIT. From 1998 to 2007 she was first assistant professor then associate professor of linguistics at the University of Georgia. In 2007 she moved to the University of Michigan to take up a position as associate professor of linguistics and Afroamerican and African studies. She was promoted to full professor in 2011 and took up her current endowed chair in 2019.

Honors 
Since 2017 she has been a Fellow of the Linguistic Society of America (LSA). She served on the Executive Committee of the LSA from 2018-2020. She is also a past president (2011–2015) of the Society for Pidgin and Creole Linguistics.

Research
Baptista's work has focused on the morphosyntax of pidgin and creole languages. She has conducted extensive fieldwork in the Cape Verdean archipelago, particularly on Cape Verdean Creole. In current research she is investigating the cognitive underpinnings of language contact situations, particularly the role of congruence in second language acquisition, bilingualism, and the origins and development of creoles. She has also collaborated with geneticists to gain a better understanding of the founding population of Cape Verde using field data and DNA.

Selected publications
 Baptista, Marlyse. 2002. The syntax of Cape Verdean Creole: the Sotavento varieties. Amsterdam: John Benjamins. 
 Baptista, Marlyse. 2005. New directions in pidgin and creole studies. Annual Review of Anthropology 34, 33–42.
 Baptista, Marlyse, and Jacqueline Guéron (eds.). 2007. Noun phrases in creole languages: a multi-faceted approach. Amsterdam: John Benjamins. 
 Baptista, Marlyse. 2007. On the syntax and semantics of DP in Cape Verdean Creole. In Baptista and Guéron (eds.), 61–105.
 Obata, Miki, Samuel D. Epstein, and Marlyse Baptista. 2015. Can crosslinguistically variant grammars be formally identical? Third factor underspecification and the possible elimination of parameters of UG. Lingua 156, 1–16.
 Verdu, Paul, Ethan M. Jewett, Trevor J. Pemberton, Noah A. Rosenberg, and Marlyse Baptista. 2017. Parallel Trajectories of Genetic and Linguistic Admixture in a Genetically Admixed Creole Population. Current Biology 27 (16), 2529–2535.e3.

References

Living people
Women linguists
American people of Cape Verdean descent
University of Bordeaux alumni
University of Massachusetts alumni
University of Michigan faculty
University of Georgia faculty
Harvard Graduate School of Arts and Sciences alumni
Year of birth missing (living people)
Fellows of the Linguistic Society of America